Bear Creek is a stream in the U.S. state of Missouri. It is a tributary of the North Fork Salt River.

Bear Creek was named after a pioneer incident in which a bear was killed near its course.

See also
List of rivers of Missouri

References

Rivers of Adair County, Missouri
Rivers of Macon County, Missouri
Rivers of Shelby County, Missouri
Rivers of Missouri